Mołożów-Kolonia  is a village in the administrative district of Gmina Mircze, within Hrubieszów County, Lublin Voivodeship, in eastern Poland, close to the border with Ukraine.

References

Villages in Hrubieszów County